En liten julsaga ("A Little Christmas story") is a 1999 Swedish children's film directed by Åsa Sjöström and Mari Marten-Bias Wahlgren.

Plot
Ina loses her loved teddy bear Nonno in the Metro after Christmas-shopping with her mum. An old man and his dog find Nonno and leave him at the post but he falls down into a bag which will go by train to Kiruna, where Anna who works at the post at the station finds him and brings him home.

Later a boy called Per-Olof finds Nonno who has disappeared from Anna's family. When two girls tease him for the teddy bear, he becomes angry and throws Nonno down on the motorway and Nonno lands on a truck which is going towards Stockholm. Later Nonno is for sale in an antique shop and Ina's older half-brother Jakob, who later comes back home from the United States, passes the shop and buys Nonno.

Selected cast
Lisa Malmborg as Ina
Gunilla Röör as Isabella, Ina's mother
Thomas Hedengran as Ina's father
Jesper Salén as Jakob
Lasse Petterson as Old man with dog who finds Nonno at the Metro
Pia Johansson as Woman who works at the post in Kiruna

See also
 List of Christmas films

External links
Swedish Film Database

Swedish children's films
1990s Swedish-language films
1999 films
Swedish Christmas films
1990s Christmas films
1990s Swedish films